Tobias Kamke and Tim Pütz were the defending champions but chose not to defend their title.

Moez Echargui and Skander Mansouri won the title after defeating Max Purcell and Luke Saville 7–6(8–6), 6–7(3–7), [10–7].

Seeds

Draw

References
 Main draw

Keio Challenger - Doubles
2019 Doubles
2019 Keio Challenger